Agustín Enrique Herrera Osuna (born 22 March 1985) is a Mexican professional footballer who plays as a forward.

Club career

Santos Laguna
Herrera made his professional debut on January 22, 2006, in a 1–0 loss to Pumas UNAM. He scored his first professional goal on March 4, 2007. He came off the bench to score in the 84th minute, as Santos defeated Monarcas Morelia, 2–1.

Agustin has seen minimal playing time for Santos, often overshadowed by the talent of Vicente Matías Vuoso and Carlos Darwin Quintero. However, he has become a key player for Santos in the CONCACAF Champions League, playing in four games and scoring five goals, including a hat-trick against C.S.D. Municipal.

Honours
Santos Laguna
Mexican Primera División: Clausura 2008

Comunicaciones
Liga Nacional de Guatemala: Apertura 2014, Clausura 2015

Antigua
Liga Nacional de Guatemala: Apertura 2017, Apertura 2018, Clausura 2019

Mixco
Primera División de Ascenso: Clausura 2022

Individual
Liga Nacional de Guatemala Top scorer: Clausura 2017, Clausura 2018, Apertura 2018, Clausura 2019

External links
 
 

1985 births
Living people
Mexican footballers
Association football forwards
Sportspeople from Los Mochis
Santos Laguna footballers
Liga MX players
Ascenso MX players
C.F. Mérida footballers
C.D. Veracruz footballers
Deportivo Coatepeque players
Comunicaciones F.C. players
Antigua GFC players